Hu Bing (born February 14, 1971) is a Chinese actor, model, singer, designer and producer. He started as a fashion model in 1990 and been a top male model in China for over 20 years. He won the "Top Chinese Male Model" title in 1991 and was the first Chinese male model to walk the international fashion runway. Since then, Hu has been the image for many top international fashion names such as Louis Vuitton, Dolce & Gabbana, Valentino, etc. Hu started his transition from the fashion runway to the TV screen in 1996 and became a household name after the success of the TV drama Love Talks (1999), in which he played the male leading role. Continuously from 2000 to 2005, Hu was voted one of the four most popular young actors in China (Hu left China to further strengthen his performing aptitude in an American institute in 2005). Hu is known for his on-screen portrayals in both China and Japan as an actor, and as a fashion icon all across East Asia.

Early life 
Hu was born in Hangzhou, Zhejiang. His parents are from military backgrounds and he has an older brother Hu Dong (胡东), who's also an acclaimed Chinese actor, model and singer. After high school, Hu attended the Zhejiang Provincial Athletic Institute, where he majored in health education and sports psychology.

Hu started training to become a professional athlete at the age of 11. He became a member of the Zhejiang Provincial team at the age of 14 and won the Chinese National Rowing Championship in the men's single scull event at the age of 16 (the youngest national champion for the event). At age 17, he was drafted into the Chinese National Rowing Team and came in 7th in the 1989 World Rowing Championships (at Lake Bled in SR Slovenia, Yugoslavia) in the men's coxless pair event at the age of 18. He was also a member of the Chinese Olympics Team during the 1988 Summer Olympics in Seoul, South Korea. Hu's professional athletic career came to an end when he suffered a back injury due to overtraining in 1990 at the age of 19, and became a fashion model soon after.

Career 

In 1991, Hu was invited by the Zhejiang Silk Trading Company to be the model for their men's catalog. In 1991, sponsored also by the Zhejiang Silk Trading Company, he entered the Chinese National Young Models Competition representing the province of Zhejiang and won first place. In 1992, Hu joined the Chinese Fashion Models Association and became a professional runway model. In 1993, filling in last minute for Valentino's Beijing World Trade Centre Show, Hu's outstanding performance won worldwide recognition.

With the success of his modeling career, Hu frequented major magazine covers and became the spokesperson for international luxury name brands such as Valentino, Louis Vuitton, and Toshiba in TV, billboard, and magazine ads. In late 1994, he was signed by the Hong Kong United Artists Entertainment Company who helped him publish his first album and gave him his first acting roles in the TV dramas The New York Storm (1996) and The Everlasting Dream (1997).

Hu became a Chinese household name after he starred in the hit Chinese TV drama Love Talks (1999). Hu's status was further solidified with the back-to-back successes of the TV dramas Pink Girls (2001) and Saying Goodbye (2002). Between 1997 and 2004, Hu starred in over ten TV dramas and numerous films, making him one of the highest in productivity among Chinese actors at the time.

2005 marked the peak of Hu's acting career. His honors included the "Ten Most Popular TV Stars" at the China Television Arts Festival for "Top Ten Best"; and the Best Idol Singer and Top 10 Songs at the Southeast Music Chart Awards.
In late 2005 he moved to the United States and studied under a renowned American performance arts mentor who is also a mentor to many A-list Hollywood stars.

Hu's foothold in the Japanese entertainment world was planted in early 2005 as the host of a Japanese traveler's TV show. He strengthened his reputation in Japan over the years as a TV show host (also co-hosted talk show "Chinese Angel" with Japan's top female celebrity Norika Fujiwara in 2011) and the star in a series of Japanese TV dramas and films, eventually becoming a household name in Japan as well. In 2011, Hu was selected by the Oscar-winning Japanese producer Toshiaki Nakazawa to co-star alongside the world-renowned Japanese mega-star Naoto Takenaka in the film Ken and Mary (2011).

In 2008, he returned to the East Asian entertainment scene after accepting the leading role in the French-Hong Kong co-production, The Back (2010), produced by the Oscar-winning French director/producer Luc Besson and directed by the internationally renowned Chinese 6th generation director, Liu Bingjian. The film obtained critical success as it won a "Best Picture" nomination and a "Best Actor" nomination for Hu during the 2010 International Rome Film Festival.

Filmography

Film

Television series

Discography

References

External links
 
 

Male actors from Hangzhou
Chinese male models
1971 births
Living people
Male actors from Zhejiang
Chinese male film actors
Chinese male television actors
21st-century Chinese male singers